Tamara "Tako" Milanova (born 17 March 1983) is a Georgian singer, songwriter and actress. She represented Georgia in the Eurovision Song Contest 2017, with the song "Keep the Faith".

Career
She took part in the national final for Georgia in the Eurovision Song Contest 2008, with the song "Me and My Funky", coming in tenth place. As a member of the quartet Stephane & 3G, she also placed fourth in the same national final with the song "I'm Free", and was going to represent Georgia in the Eurovision Song Contest 2009 with the song "We Don't Wanna Put In", until the group's entry was disqualified for political content. She intended to enter Georgian national final for the Eurovision Song Contest in 2011, but ultimately withdrew due to health problems.

In 2017, she represented Georgia in the Eurovision Song Contest 2017 with the song "Keep the Faith" but failed to qualify to the final, finishing in 11th place in the first semi-final.

Personal life
In 2018, Gachechiladze married Bulgarian songwriter Borislav Milanov at Mama Daviti Church in Tbilisi. They had met while both were participating in the Eurovision Song Contest 2017; Gachechiladze was representing Georgia, while Milanov had written the entries for Serbia, North Macedonia, and Bulgaria. They have two children and live in Austria.

Discography

Singles

References

External links

1983 births
Living people
21st-century women singers from Georgia (country)
Eurovision Song Contest entrants of 2017
Eurovision Song Contest entrants for Georgia (country)
Musicians from Tbilisi
Pop singers from Georgia (country)